Leptipsius is a genus of beetles in the family Monotomidae, containing the following species:

 Leptipsius brevicornis (Sharp, 1900)
 Leptipsius crassus Sharp, 1900
 Leptipsius dilutus Casey, 1916
 Leptipsius eumorphus Sharp, 1900
 Leptipsius imberbis Bousquet, 2003
 Leptipsius striatus LeConte, 1858

References

Monotomidae
Cucujoidea genera